John Wishart (died 1338) was a 14th-century bishop of Glasgow. He was archdeacon of Glasgow from 1321 or earlier. After the death of Bishop John de Lindesay in 1335, John was elected to succeed him at Glasgow, and was consecrated in February 1337 at the orders of Pope Benedict XII at Avignon by Annibald de Ceccano, bishop of Tusculum. His episcopate was extremely brief. His exact death date is not known, but we know that the see was again vacant on 11 May 1338. He was succeeded by William Rae.

References
 Dowden, John, The Bishops of Scotland, ed. J. Maitland Thomson, (Glasgow, 1912)

13th-century births
1338 deaths
Bishops of Glasgow
14th-century Scottish Roman Catholic bishops